Aloys is an unincorporated community in Cuming County, Nebraska, United States.

History
A post office was established at Aloys in 1895, and remained in operation until it was discontinued in 1902.

References

Unincorporated communities in Cuming County, Nebraska
Unincorporated communities in Nebraska